Joseph Oden Rudi (born September 7, 1946) is an American former professional baseball player.

A three-time All-Star, Rudi excelled as an offensive and as a defensive player, winning three Gold Glove Awards and was the 1972 American League leader in hits with 181. He also played for the California Angels and the Boston Red Sox. In 2022, Rudi was inducted into the Athletics Hall of Fame.

Playing career 
Rudi was born in Modesto, California. He graduated from Thomas Downey High School in Modesto, California. He batted a career-high .309 in 1970 and led the American League a career-high 181 hits in 1972. He finished second in American League MVP voting behind Dick Allen. That year, he helped the Athletics win the World Series and made a great game-saving catch in Game 2 that went on to become part of the highlight reel for many Major League Baseball films.  With Tony Pérez on first and Oakland leading 2-0 in the ninth inning, Rudi raced to the left-field fence and made a leaping, backhanded catch of Denis Menke's smash to save a run.  Earlier in the game, Rudi hit a solo home run. He also caught Pete Rose's fly ball for the final out of the Series.

In 1974 he had a career best 22 home runs and 99 runs batted in while leading the American League with 287 total bases. He was also awarded his first career Gold Glove Award and was once again the runner-up in AL MVP voting behind Jeff Burroughs. Rudi hit a home run in Game 5 of the 1974 World Series off Mike Marshall that would turn out to be the game winner and Series clincher. Rudi's Athletics became the first team since the 1949–1953 New York Yankees to win three straight World Series titles.

In 1975, he was elected by the fans as a starter in the All-Star Game as an outfielder, where he joined four other Oakland A's in the American League starting lineup.  He also played some first base for the A's in 1975.

With baseball entering the free agency era, A's owner Charlie Finley attempted to sell Rudi and pitcher Rollie Fingers to the Boston Red Sox for $1 million each at the MLB trade deadline on June 15, 1976, rather than trading them (as he had done with Reggie Jackson and Ken Holtzman the year before) or risking losing them in free agency.  Rudi actually reported to the Red Sox and was issued a uniform, but never was permitted to play, as baseball Commissioner Bowie Kuhn voided the transaction as not being in the best interests of baseball. Rudi later played for Boston in 1981.

Rudi, along with Don Baylor, ended up leaving the A's as a free agent and signed with the California Angels for the 1977 season.  However, Rudi's tenure with the Angels was mostly injury-plagued, even though he posted respectable home run and RBI totals in his four seasons.  His best year with the Angels was 1978, when he played in 133 games and hit .256 with 17 home runs and 79 RBI's.  He missed the Angels' 1979 post-season run with injury.  After the 1980 season, Rudi was traded by the Angels along with Frank Tanana to the Red Sox for Fred Lynn. After one injury-filled season, he closed his career back with the A's in 1982 and hit a home run in his last professional at-bat.

In a sixteen-year major league career, Rudi played in 1,547 games, compiling a .264 batting average (1,468-for-5,556) with 684 runs scored, 287 doubles, 39 triples, 179 home runs, 810 RBI and 369 walks. His on-base percentage was .311 and slugging percentage was .427. Strong defensively, he recorded a career .991 fielding percentage at all three outfield positions. In 38 post-season games, covering five American League Championship Series and three World Series from 1971-75, he handled 124 total chances (120 putouts, 4 assists) without an error. 

Rudi is retired and lives with his wife Sharon, in The Villages, Florida. He is a long-time amateur radio operator with the call sign NK7U.

See also
 List of Major League Baseball annual doubles leaders
 List of Major League Baseball annual triples leaders

References

External links
, or Joe Rudi - Baseballbiography.com, or Baseball Page, or Retrosheet, or SABR Biography Project, or Pura Pelota (Venezuelan Winter League), or Rudsi' Ham Radio Contest Station, or Rudi's Real Estate Site

1946 births
Living people
Amateur radio people
American League All-Stars
Arizona Instructional League Mesa players
Baseball players from California
Birmingham A's players
Boston Red Sox players
California Angels players
Daytona Beach Islanders players
Dubuque Packers players
Florida Instructional League Athletics players
Gold Glove Award winners
Iowa Oaks players
Kansas City Athletics players
Major League Baseball left fielders
Modesto Reds players
Navegantes del Magallanes players
American expatriate baseball players in Venezuela
Oakland Athletics coaches
Oakland Athletics players
People from Baker City, Oregon
Sportspeople from Modesto, California
Vancouver Mounties players
Wytheville A's players
Modesto Pirates baseball players